Lucius Herennius Saturninus was a Roman senator active during the reign of Domitian and Trajan (c. AD 81–117). He was suffect consul for the nundinium of May to June AD 100, with Pomponius Mamilianus as his colleague. 

The cursus honorum of Saturninus is incomplete; only the two governorships he held are known. The first province he governed, as a proconsul, was Achaea in 98/99 before his consulship. The other province was Moesia Superior, after his consulship from 102 to 106. During his governorship, Trajan's Second Dacian War erupted. It is unclear how Saturninus was involved in this conflict, but his name is one of three legati legiones or legionary commanders mentioned in "Hunt's Pridianum", a papyrus document from the archive of a Roman auxiliary unit stationed along the Danube. This suggests he was involved in this war to some degree.

See also 
 Herennia gens

References 

1st-century Romans
2nd-century Romans
Roman governors of Achaia
Suffect consuls of Imperial Rome
Roman governors of Upper Moesia
Saturninus